Ben Black (born 29 April 1981) is an Australian former professional rugby league footballer who played in the 2000s and 2010s as a scrum-half.  He played for Wests Tigers before joining Halifax, and also went on to play for Batley Bulldogs.

Playing career
Black made his first grade debut for the Wests Tigers in Round 4 2001 against Brisbane.  In 2004, Black joined English side Halifax.

Black kicked the winning drop goal that gave Halifax the win in the 2010 Co-operative Championship Grand Final.

In 2012, Black joined Batley and played with the club until the end of 2014 before retiring at the end of the season.

Upon returning to Australia, Black was the captain/coach of Group 9 club Wagga Brothers.

References

1981 births
Living people
Australian rugby league players
Rugby league halfbacks
Wests Tigers players
Halifax R.L.F.C. players
Batley Bulldogs players
Place of birth missing (living people)
Rugby league players from New South Wales